Minister for Family and Consumer Affairs of Denmark was a political office in the Danish government created in August 2004 and worked primarily for families and with consumption-related topics. The main purpose of the ministry was to protect the interests of families in a wider sense. The minister was the head of the new Ministry for Family and Consumer Affairs.

The ministry mainly covered consumers' protection, children, family and youth related areas, custody of children, adoption, marriage, divorce and food safety (including nutrition and pest control). The ministry was organized into a department of 60 employees, 3 sub-departments and a research institution. The ministry employed a total of 3,000 people.

December 13, 2006 Danish People's Party announced, that they no longer had faith in Lars Barfoed. Barfoed subsequently announced his resignation on national TV, effective the following day. He was succeeded by Carina Christensen, appointed on December 15, 2006.

It has been abolished after the 2007 Folketing elections, and its responsibilities have since been assigned to the new Danish Ministry of Social Welfare.

List of ministers

References

Family and Consumer Affairs
Society of Denmark
Denmark, Family and Consumer Affairs

Family in Denmark